Ctenucha subsemistria is a moth of the family Erebidae. It is found in Argentina.

The wingspan is about 32 mm.

References

subsemistria
Moths described in 1915